The Coupe de France 1996–97 was its 80th edition. It was won by OGC Nice which defeated En Avant Guingamp in the Final.

Round of 16

Quarter-finals

Semi-finals

Final

Topscorer
Ibrahima Bakayoko (3 goals)
Thierry De Neef (3 goals)
Arnaud Lassalle (3 goals)
Fabien Lefévre (3 goals)
Didier Tholot (3 goals)
Christopher Wreh (3 goals)

References

French federation
1996–97 Coupe de France at ScoreShelf.com

1996–97 domestic association football cups
1996–97 in French football
1996-97